Andrés Mosquera may refer to:

 Andrés Mosquera (footballer, born 1978), Colombian football defender
 Andrés Mosquera (footballer, born 1989), Colombian football forward
 Andrés Mosquera (footballer, born 1990), Colombian football defender
 Andrés Mosquera (footballer, born 1991), Colombian football goalkeeper